Sassoferrato is a town and comune of the province of Ancona in the Marche region of central-eastern Italy.

History 
To the south of the town lie the ruins of the ancient Sentinum, on the Via Flaminia. The castle above the town is mentioned from the 11th century; the town belonged to the House of Este from 1208, later to the Atti family, becoming a free municipality in 1460 after the assassination of Luigi degli Atti.

Geography 
Sassoferrato borders with the municipalities of Arcevia, Fabriano, Genga, Serra Sant'Abbondio (PU), Pergola (PU), Costacciaro (PG, Umbria) and Scheggia e Pascelupo (PG, Umbria).

Frazioni 
A frazione is a type of subdivision of a comune (municipality) in Italy:

 Baruccio
 Borgo Sassoferrato
 Breccia di Venatura
 Cabernardi
 Ca' Boccolino
 Camarano
 Camazzocchi
 Canderico
 Cantarino
 Caparucci
 Capoggi
 Casalvento
 Case Aia
 Castagna
 Castagna Bassa
 Castiglioni
 Catobagli
 Col Canino
 Coldapi
 Col della Noce
 Doglio
 Felcioni
 Frassineta
 Gaville
 Giontarello
 La Frasca
 Liceto
 Mandole
 Montelago
 Monterosso
 Monterosso Stazione
 Morello
 Pantana
 Perticano
 Piagge
 Piaggiasecca
 Piano di Frassineta
 Piano di Murazzano
 Radicosa
 Regedano
 Rondinella
 Rotondo
 San Egidio
 San Felice
 San Giovanni
 San Paolo
 San Ugo
 Sassoferrato Castello
 Schioppetto
 Scorzano
 Sementana
 Seriole
 Serra San Facondino
 Stavellina
 Valdolmo
 Valitosa
 Venatura

Notable people 
 Bartolo da Sassoferrato (1313–1359)
 Cardinal Alessandro Oliva (1407–1463)
 Niccolò Perotti (1430–1480), humanist
 Antonio Perotti (1535–1582), captain named the "Paladin of Italy" by Alessandro Farnese
 Pietro Paolo Agabiti (1470–1540), painter and architect
 Pandolfo Collenuccio (1444–1504), man of letters
 Giovani Battista Salvi (1609–1685), Italian Baroque painter, called "the Sassoferrato"
 Baldassarre Olimpo degli Alessandri (1480? – 1540?), poet

References

External links 

  
 Official Tourism website

Cities and towns in the Marche